Banuband (also Romanized as Banūband, Banooband, Banū Band, Benū Band, and Bonūband) is a village in Tazian Rural District, in the Central District of Bandar Abbas County, Hormozgan Province, Iran. At the 2006 census, its population was 586, in 123 families.

References 

Populated places in Bandar Abbas County